During the 1990–91 English football season, Wimbledon F.C. competed in the Football League First Division.

Season summary
In the 1990–91 season under Harford's first full campaign in charge, Warren Barton was purchased for £300,000 whilst in the league, Wimbledon had another strong season, finishing in 7th place.

Nothing came of the plans for a new ground and at the end of the season, Wimbledon's board decided that Plough Lane was beyond redevelopment to meet the new FA rule requiring all-seater stadiums. Consequently, the club moved to Selhurst Park before the start of next season, ground-sharing with Crystal Palace.

Final league table

Results
Wimbledon's score comes first

Legend

Football League First Division

FA Cup

League Cup

Full Members Cup

Squad

Transfers

In

Out

Transfers in:  £570,000
Transfers out:  £2,625,000
Total spending:  £2,055,000

References

Wimbledon F.C. seasons
Wimbledon